The Northern California Power Agency, located in Roseville, California, is a joint powers agency formed in 1968 to provide its members with electrical energy purchasing, aggregation, scheduling and management. It coordinates with the California Independent System Operator.

As of 2022, the NCPA's 796 megawatt portfolio consisted of geothermal, hydroelectric, and natural gas power plants, which were 55% greenhouse gas emission-free.

In 2006, the NCPA began annual cloud seeding operations to increase precipitation, and as of 2022 was one of seven agencies in California that are running such programs.

Members
As of September 2022:
Alameda Municipal Power
Bay Area Rapid Transit
City of Biggs
City of Gridley
City of Healdsburg
City of Lompoc
City of Palo Alto
City of Ukiah
Lodi Electric Utility
Port of Oakland
Redding Electric Utility
Roseville Electric
Silicon Valley Power
Truckee Donner PUD
Plumas-Sierra Rural Electric Cooperative
Shasta Lake

External links
ncpa.com

References

Energy in California
Companies based in Placer County, California
Roseville, California
American companies established in 1968
Energy companies established in 1968